Haga is a surname and toponym common to Japan, Norway, Sweden and Swedish-speaking parts of Finland. Haga may refer to:

People
Akane Haga (2002), 12th generation member of Japanese pop group Morning Musume
Arnfinn Haga (born 1936), Norwegian teacher and non-fiction writer 
Arild Haga (1913–1985), Norwegian revue writer
, Japanese footballer
, Civil servant in the Netherlands Indies (governor of Borneao)
Borghild Bondevik Haga (1906–1990), Norwegian politician for the Liberal Party 
Cornelius Haga (1578–1654), first ambassador of the Dutch Republic to the Ottoman Empire
Edvard Haga (1893–1968), Finnish politician
Hans Haga (1924–2008), Norwegian agrarian leader 
Hans Jensen Haga (1845–1924), Norwegian politician for the Conservative Party
Herman Haga (1852–1936), Dutch physicist
, Japanese boxer
, Japanese gymnast
Marcelius Haga (1882–1968), Norwegian politician
Noriyuki Haga (born 1975), Japanese Superbike World Championship rider
Ragnhild Haga (born 1991), Norwegian cross-country skier
, Japanese speed skater
Ryunosuke Haga (born 1991), Japanese judoka
, Japanese ice hockey player

Fictional
Insector Haga, character from Yu-Gi-Oh! Duel Monsters (Weevil Underwood in English language adaptations)

Places

Finland
Haaga, a district in Helsinki
Hagalund, a district in Espoo

Japan
Haga, Hyōgo, a former town in Hyōgo Prefecture
Haga, Tochigi, a town in Tochigi Prefecture
Haga District, Tochigi, a district in Tochigi Prefecture

Norway
Haga, Nes, a village in Nes municipality in Viken county
Haga Station, a railway station located in the village of Haga in Nes municipality
Haga, Vestland, a village in Samnanger municipality in Vestland county
Haga Church (Norway), a church in the village of Haga in Samnanger municipality

Sweden
Håga, locality situated in Uppsala Municipality, Uppsala County, Sweden 
Haga, Gothenburg, a district in Gothenburg
Haga, Umeå, a residential area in Umeå
Haga Castle, Swedish castle outside Enköping by Lake Mälaren
Haga Church, a church located in Gothenburg, Sweden 
Haga Echo Temple, situated in Hagaparken in Stockholm  
Haga, Enköping, locality situated in Enköping Municipality, Uppsala County, Sweden, 
Haga Palace, located in Hagaparken, Solna Municipality in Sweden
Haga trädgård, located in the northern end of Hagaparken Solna, Sweden 
Hagaparken (Haga Park), in Solna Municipality just north of Stockholm

Other
The battle cry of Sapporo cannoneers. 
Hebrew term for yum-yum.
, a number of steamships

Japanese-language surnames
Norwegian-language surnames
Finnish-language surnames